John G. M. Mwirichia is a Kenyan politician and businessman. John Mwirichia began involvement in politics in 1992 during the struggle of multiparty democracy in Kenya and was in the forefront of the then Ford party to ensure that Kenya did not remain a one-party state. When multiparty was finally achieved, he went on to be elected Ford-Kenya chairman Nairobi branch and has since held various positions in the party. Mwirichia's identification with the mwananchi has endeared him to Kenyan hearts. Especially notable is his current struggle for a socialist nation where all Kenyans including those in power such as the president and members of parliament pay their taxes.

He has in the past visibly opposed the award of salary increment by MPs and was quoted by both the Standard newspaper (Kenya) and Kenya Television Network (KTN) of 26 June 2002 thus: “ the proposed hike by the MPs was tantamount to asking Kenyans to bribe them to represent them in Parliament"

He has argued vehemently that this Country did not need and still does not need 'Foreign Constitutional Experts' as equivalents can easily be found within the borders. Lacking though is political goodwill to implement this state of affairs.. He also criticized the 'request' to subsidize ineptitude, mismanagement and corruption by Nairobi City Council when they wanted to increase Rates by 3000% in 2001 and the same was revoked by the then Local Government Minister Hon. Uhuru Kenyatta.

Mwirichia is also the founder and director of Sportex Investments which was started in 1999 and has gone on to become the leading industrial ball manufacturing companies in Nairobi province. Mwirichia is also currently serving as Finance Director of Kenya Industrial Estates.

References
 Kenya Times 24 December 1999
 https://web.archive.org/web/20070528213946/http://www.kie.co.ke/css/structure.html
 http://www.usiu.ac.ke/administration/departments/registrar/graduation/20042005/commencement_program.doc

Year of birth missing (living people)
Living people
Forum for the Restoration of Democracy – Kenya politicians